Melville was an electoral district of the Legislative Assembly in the Australian state of Western Australia from 1950 to 1996. The district was based in the southern suburbs of Perth.

History
First contested at the 1950 state election, the seat's inaugural member was John Tonkin of the Labor Party, hitherto the member for North-East Fremantle since 1933. Tonkin served a long career in parliament, going to become Premier of Western Australia from 1971 to 1974. When Tonkin finally retired at the 1977 state election, he was succeeded by fellow Labor candidate Barry Hodge. Hodge served four terms before his defeat at the hands of Liberal candidate Doug Shave.

Melville was abolished ahead of the 1996 state election. Shave went on to become the member for the new seat of Alfred Cove.

Members for Melville

Election results

Melville
1950 establishments in Australia
Constituencies established in 1950
1996 disestablishments in Australia
Constituencies disestablished in 1996